We're In the Music Biz is the third album by Robots in Disguise. On the cover of the album the band members, Dee Plume and Sue Denim, are naked. The clothes they appear to be wearing is body paint.

Track listing

References

We're In the Music Biz
Robots in Disguise albums